The African Orthodox Church (AOC), registered as the Holy African Orthodox Church, is an Episcopalian, primarily African-American denomination which was founded in the United States in 1918 by the joint collaboration of its first Patriarch George Alexander McGuire and Marcus M. Garvey. It has approximately 15 parishes and 5,000 members, significantly down from its peak membership.

The AOC holds to the historic three-fold ministry of bishops, priests, and deacons, and lays strong emphasis on apostolic succession. The church celebrates the seven sacraments of the Catholic Church. Its worship is liturgical, of Eastern and Western rites. The Nicene, Apostles', and Athanasian creeds are affirmed.

History 

The African Orthodox Church (AOC) was founded on the belief that black Episcopalians should have a denomination of their own. Episcopal rector George Alexander McGuire was consecrated a bishop on September 28, 1921, who had served as Chaplain-General of the Universal Negro Improvement Association (U. N. I. A.), in Chicago, Illinois, by an episcopus vagans, Archbishop Joseph Rene Vilatte, assisted by Bishop Carl A. Nybladh who had been consecrated by Vilatte. This placed Bishop McGuire in apostolic succession, which was something he had greatly desired.

It had its episcopal see in New York City but incorporated in Florida. It claimed 13 organizations, with a membership of 1,508 without a church edifice. There was no organization reporting a parsonage. The number of ministers identified with the church was 30.

Another denomination first reported in Religious Bodies, 1926 edition, named the African Orthodox Church of New York (AOCoNY) also had its episcopal see in New York City and incorporated in New York. It claimed three organizations, with a membership of 717 with one church edifice. There was one organization reporting a parsonage. The number of ministers identified with the church was not reported.

The African Orthodox Church originally attracted mostly Anglican West Indian immigrants. It spread to the South in 1925 when McGuire started a parish in West Palm Beach, Florida. Two years later he consecrated an African, Daniel William Alexander, as Primate of the Province of South Africa and central and southern Africa. At this time McGuire was elected as patriarch with the title of Alexander I. The church then spread to British Uganda and British Kenya, where it grew to about 10,000. A congregation also developed in Nassau, Bahamas.

In 1932 a bishop of the church went to Uganda and ordained Ruben Spartus Mukasa and one of his associates there priests of the African Orthodox Church. However, a few years later, Mukasa and his followers decided to align with the Greek Orthodox Church of Alexandria. Mukasa went to Alexandria and was ordained by the patriarch there, while the African Orthodox Church lost its connection in Uganda.

The St. John William Coltrane Church in San Francisco was founded in 1971 and joined the AOC in 1982.

Relationship to the Oriental Syriac Patriarchate 

The notice named the  specifically as an example of such schismatic bodies.

See also 

 Evangelical Orthodox Church
 Harlem Renaissance
 Raphael Morgan

References

Works cited 
 Alexander, D. W. Constitution and Canons and Episcopate of the African Orthodox Church Beaconsfield 1942
 Arthur C. Thompson's The History of the African Orthodox Church (1956)
 Byron Rushing's A Note on the Origin of the African Orthodox Church (JNH, Jan. 1972)
 Gavin White. "Patriarch McGuire and the Episcopal Church" in Historical Magazine of the Protestant Episcopal Church. No. 38. — 1969. — P. 109—141.

External links 
 NetMinistries - African Orthodox Church, Inc.
 A Place For The Soul To Sing: The Church Of St. John Coltrane, Carvell Wallace, 5 April 2016, MTV.

Anglicanism in the United States
Christian denominations established in the 20th century
Christian organizations established in 1921
Historically African-American Christian denominations
Old Catholic denominations in the United States
1921 establishments in Illinois